Residential genealogy is

The linking of people and places throughout history. Residential Genealogy has two main facets:

•	Discovering the genealogy of a particular home, building, or land through history.  Identifying the owners of a house throughout its lifetime is a good example of a singular vertical historical search.  It's not necessarily a “who slept here” endeavor but a “who owned this” question.

•	A more common, personal approach is to find out where your ancestors lived and owned property. Being landed gentry has been a goal of people throughout history. So this residential genealogy is more related to researching family names and places and finding out what property was owned. It can be quite exciting to see your family name on a historical map from the 1700s.

Residential Genealogy is of interest to history buffs, genealogy searchers, and real estate agents. Anyone who has ever lived in an older home has, at some point, wondered who the earlier occupants might have been. Even if they live in a modern home, they may also wonder how their neighborhood evolved: which homes were built when, and the progression of neighboring streets. Residential Genealogy also shows ghost towns, and what was in a place before reservoirs, cemeteries, etc.

This research usually requires a collection of 19th- and early 20th-century American city, town, and county maps. The detailed maps, usually Cadastral Maps show every building and every street in each city or town. Each single-dwelling home contains the name of the family who resided there, either on or beside the building on the map. Apartment complexes contained the property owner's name.  Other research tools are antique city directories, census records and phone books which enhance the ability of researchers to trace not only the history of any location but also the people in these locations back in time.

If your research is online, finding a specific historic home or building can be easy, as map collections are linked with modern mapping technology that references existing street names and numbers. By simply typing in an address, users can follow the progression of buildings and neighborhoods through time-in some cases up to 250 years. Like modern digital maps, these online historic maps are extremely detailed and comprehensive, showing the location and footprint of nearly all structures of the period.

References 
http://www.historicmapworks.com

Books:
  House Histories: A Guide to Tracing the Genealogy of Your Home by Sally Light
  Discovering the History of Your House: And Your Neighborhood by Betsy J. Green
  Tracing the History Of Your House: A Guide to Sources by Nick Barratt
  Finding Your Home's Ancestors by Ann Senefeld
 

Genealogy
Housing